Litzirüti railway station is a railway station on the Chur–Arosa railway (the "Arosabahn") of the Rhaetian Railway (RhB). It is situated in the hamlet of Litzirüti.

The station has a small café on the Arosa end of the main platform.

Services
The following services stop at Litzirüti:

References

External links
 
 

Arosa
Railway stations in Graubünden
Rhaetian Railway stations
Railway stations in Switzerland opened in 1914